The Saint Petersburg State Puppet Theatre of Fairy Tales also known as the "Fairy Tale Theater"  is an all-ages, Russian puppet theatre focused on imaginative, morallic performances based around personifying the world through quixotic fantasy and peaceful conditions. The theater currently has a repertoire comprised on 28 fairy tales, including "Aladdin and the magic lamp," "Aybolit," "The Wizard of Oz," and "Little Longnose." They are also recognized as one of the best puppet theaters in Russia. In 2017, the theater began offering educational classes as part of the project "Theater Time," launched for students in primary school all the way to grades 5-11 as a way to educate them on the profession of puppetry. They mostly cater to children due to the playful and charming nature of the puppet designs and performance themes, along with absence of harsh language or overly heavy subject matter.

History 
Following the fall of the Berlin Wall and near the end of WW2, the "Fairy Tale Theater" had its first performance on December 31, 1944 as a way to help the children of Leningrad alleviate their stress and fear from the war around them.

In the beginning of the 1970s, then lead Creative Director and Honored Art Worker of the Russian Federation Yuri Eliseev invited Theatrical Production Designer Nelly Polyakova, another Honored Art Worker of the Russian Federation, and Director/Playwright, yet another Honored Worker of Arts of Russia, Nikolai Borovkov to collaborate.

Currently, there are 20 actors and actresses working as part of the Fairy Tale Theater, all of them award-winning performers, with two acting as the principle figures, Emilia Kulikova [born Emilia Sergeevna] and Valentin Morozov. The company tours regularly throughout Europe and has been to the United States.

Repertoire 
The composer Boris Kravchenko wrote music for many of the company's productions, following the simple and expressive style of Russian folk songs.

The current repertoire consists of 33 fairy-tales of Russian, European, and American orientation.

 African Forest Tales
 Aibolit
 Aladdin and the magic lamp
 The Wizard of Oz
 Wild Swans
 Butterfly Story
 How Teryoshechka defeated the witch!
 The Little Humpbacked Horse
 Cat and Mouse
 Who will wake up the sun?
 Three Pigs
 Pinocchio against Karabas or "Long live Santa Claus!"
 The Adventures of an Unlucky Dragon 
 Fox-Cork
 A Tale of King Sultan
 Really, we will always be?
 Mermaid
 The tale of the dead princess and seven heros
 The tale of the capricious princess and King of the frogs
 Lyushin's Fairy Tales
 Santa Clause and Aliens
 Once upon Thumbelina
 Little Longnose
 Chu-ko-ko
 Binky's Curious Cub
 Masha and the Bear
 Blue Beard
 Snoggle (Green Blood)
 Black Chicken
 The Nutcracker and the Mouse King
 The Snow Queen
 Elion v.2
 Little Muck

See also 

 Russian puppet theater
 Russian Theatrical Society

References

Theatres in Saint Petersburg
Puppet theaters
Russian puppeteers
Performing arts in Russia
Theatre in Russia